The Dragon Prince, also known as The Dragon Prince: Mystery of Aaravos after the release of season 4, is a fantasy computer-animated television series created for Netflix by Aaron Ehasz and Justin Richmond, produced by Wonderstorm and animated by Bardel Entertainment. The series follows the story of the half-brother princes Callum and Ezran and the moonshadow elf Rayla, who, as they take care of the infant dragon Prince Azymondias, must end the thousand-year-old conflict between the human kingdoms and the mystical creatures of the magical realm of Xadia, where all seven primal sources of magic, both light and dark, come from.

The series has earned critical acclaim for its story, themes, vocal performances, animation, and humor. The first season premiered on September 14, 2018. Season 2 followed on February 15, 2019, and season 3 on November 22, 2019. Season 4 premiered on November 3, 2022, following a three-year hiatus. The show has been renewed for three additional seasons, each with nine episodes. A video game set in the same world as the series is in development.

Summary
The series is set in a fantasy world on the mystical continent of Xadia, which is rich in magic derived from six primal sources: the Moon, the Sky, the Sun, Earth, the Ocean and the Stars. Centuries ago, the dragons, six races of elves, and humans of Xadia lived in peace. However, the humans, being unable to utilize magic naturally, began to use a seventh primal source, dark magic, which is fueled by the life essence of magical creatures. As a consequence, they were driven away to the west, and the continent was split in two by a massive river of lava.

One millennium later, the human King Harrow of Katolis and his advisor, the dark mage Viren, have killed the dragon king, Avizandum, and supposedly destroyed his heir's egg. In retaliation, elf assassins attempt to kill Harrow and his son, Ezran. Ezran, his half-brother Callum, and the young Moonshadow Elf assassin Rayla discover that the remaining sky dragon's egg was not destroyed after all; they undertake a dangerous mission to return the egg to its mother, Queen Xubeia, in Xadia. Viren seizes power after King Harrow's assassination and sends his children Claudia and Soren to kill the princes and recover the egg. At the end of the first season, the egg hatches into the titular character, Prince Azymondias, nicknamed Zym.

In the second season, Viren attempts to rally the other human kingdoms to war against Xadia; he also makes a secret alliance with the mysterious, imprisoned Startouch Elf and archmage Aaravos, who reveals himself and communicates from his prison initially via a mirror that resided in the home cavern of the previous King of the Sky Dragons, Zym's father, and later via a caterpillar-like creature. Meanwhile, Callum becomes the first human to directly access primal magic, connecting with the Sky Arcanum. By the end of Season 2, Viren is imprisoned for treason for having illicitly used Harrow's seal, and for abusing his powers of dark magic. Ezran learns of his father's death and returns to Katolis to claim the throne.

In the third season, Ezran is manipulated into abdicating the throne amid pressure for war, and he rejoins Callum and Rayla to return Zym to his dying mother at her home, the Storm Spire. Viren, restored to power, leads the human armies against Xadia, amassing even more dark magic with the help of Aaravos. Soren defects to resist his father's evil goals. Viren's army is defeated by the elves and their allies. Rayla throws herself and Viren from the summit of the Spire, and Callum uses Sky magic to save Rayla. Zym is returned to his mother. Claudia revives Viren using dark magic, and Aaravos's caterpillar enters metamorphosis.

In the fourth season, which takes place two years later, relationships between Xadia and the five human realms have generally improved, but resentments and doubts still linger. Rayla returns from her fruitless search for Viren and her long-lost parents, Lain and Tiadrin, and legal guardian Runnan. But just when things seem to improve, Aaravos sets his imminent release in motion using Viren and Claudia, and Callum, as his pawns. The Dragon Queen reveals that, when Aaravos was imprisoned, the keys to his prison were divided among the Archdragons, and included Avizandum's mirror (which had been stolen along with Zym's egg by Viren). King Ezran, Callum, Rayla and Soren go on a quest to find the missing clues held by the Archdragons of the five out of six primal sources, seeking the first from Rex Igneous the Archdragon of Earth.

Voice cast and characters

Main characters
 Prince /High Mage Callum (voiced by Jack De Sena): Ezran's older teenage half-brother and King Harrow's stepson. He becomes the first human to wield primal magic on his own and begins a relationship with Rayla. He becomes the new High Mage of Katolis by the start of the fourth season's two-year time gap and now has a mastery of sky magic.
 Rayla (voiced by Paula Burrows): A prodigy teenage Moonshadow Elf assassin who teams up with Callum and Ezran in order to deliver the Dragon Prince back to his mother. In time, she and Callum begin a romantic relationship.
 Crown Prince / King Ezran (voiced by Sasha Rojen): The youngest son of King Harrow and Callum's younger half-brother who has the ability to speak with animals. He becomes the King of Katolis at the start of the third season.
 Viren (voiced by Jason Simpson): King Harrow's closest advisor, the High Mage of Katolis, and one of the series' main antagonists. A practitioner of dark magic, he seeks the advancement of the human race and their dominance over Xadia by any means necessary, ending up manipulated by the mysterious Elf Aaravos in the course of his pursuits.
 Claudia (voiced by Racquel Belmonte): Viren's daughter, Soren's younger sister and a talented dark mage. She is loyal to her father regardless of his ambitions for domination over Xadia.
 Soren (voiced by Jesse Inocalla): Viren's son, Claudia's older brother and a member of the Katolian Crownguard. A boastful and immature, but skillful and good-hearted soldier.
 Prince Azymondias / "Zym" (vocalized by Jack De Sena): An infant Sky Dragon, son of the late King Avizandum and Queen Zubeia, and the titular character of the series. He reunites with his mother, and has grown stronger as a sky dragon in the next two years.

Supporting characters

Humans
 King Harrow (voiced by Luc Roderique): The late King of the human kingdom of Katolis, and the late father of Crown Prince (later King) Ezran and late stepfather of Prince/High Mage Callum. He was murdered by Moonshadow assassins and was cremated by his grieving people. He gifts Callum a heartfelt letter that explains about the cube that had so intrigued Callum since he was young as the mystical Key of Aavaros. 
 Queen Sarai (voiced by Kazumi Evans): The late Queen of Katolis and mother of Prince Callum and Crown Prince Ezran who was killed by Avizandum nine years before the beginning of the series.
 General Amaya: The deaf maternal aunt of Callum and Ezran who communicates in sign language, and the commander of the Standing Battalion, a Katolian army who guards the border between the human kingdoms and Xadia. In the two-year time skip, she became the fiance of the Sunfire elf, Queen Janai.
 Commander Gren (voiced by Adrian Petriw): Amaya's close friend and interpreter and the loyal second-in-command of the Standing Battalion.
 Barius (voiced by Jason Simpson): The baker of Katolis' royal court, who is fond of Ezran despite him having stolen many of his jelly tarts in the past.
 Opeli (voiced by Paula Burrows): The High Cleric of Katolis and a prominent member of the High Council of Katolis who opposes Viren.
 Marcos (voiced by Jesse Inocalla): A young soldier in the Kotalias Crownguard.
 Corvus (voiced by Omari Newton): One of General Amaya's scouts and later Ezran's bodyguard.
 Ellis (voiced by Nahanni Mitchell): A young girl from a village at the foot of the Cursed Caldera.
 Associate Crow Lord (formerly Crow Master) (voiced by Cole Howard): The deputy of the ever-absent Crow Lord, the chief caretaker of the Katolian court's messenger crows.
 Lieutenant Fen (voiced by Sam Vincent): A high-ranking soldier in the Standing Battalion.
 Captain Villads (voiced by Peter Kelamis): A blind and eccentric ex-pirate and captain of the ship the Revenge.
 Queen Aanya (voiced by Zelda Ehasz): The juvenile ruler of Duren who is wise beyond her years.
 King Ahling (voiced by Ian James Corlett): The ruler of the kingdom of Neolandia and the father of Crown Prince Kasef.
 King Florian: The ruler of the kingdom of Del Bar who is killed by the shadow monsters sent by High Mage Viren.
 Queen Fareeda: The ruler of the kingdom of Evenere.
 Queen Annika and Queen Neha (voiced by Paula Burrows and Patricia Isaac): The former joint rulers of the kingdom of Duren and the late mothers of Aanya who were killed by Avizandum nine years before the beginning of the series.
 Saleer (voiced by Jonathan Holmes): A member of the High Council of Katolis who turns against King Ezran.
 Crown Prince Kasef (voiced by Vincent Tong): The heir to the realm of Neolandia who took the throne after his father, King Ahling, was gravely injured, and calls for war against Xadia.
 Lucia (voiced by Ana Sani): The architect of the Sunfire Elf camp who callously interrupted a religions ritual concerning a Sunfire elf man's recently late mother's spirit flame. 
 High Mage Ziard (voiced by Brian Drummond): The very first human to discover and use the seventh primal source, dark magic, before humankind's exile to the western parts of Xadia. Many years before the beginning of the series, he was killed in battle with King Sol Regem when he refused to relinquish his newfound power.
The Jailer (voiced by TBA): She was a strong human mage who had witnessed the almighty Startouch elf Aaravos being imprisoned alongside the Orphan Queen and a Tidebound elf mage over three centuries ago.

Elves
The Elves are divided into six races based on the six primal elements; Moonshadow Elves, Skywing Elves, Sunfire Elves, Earthblood Elves, Tidebound Elves, and Startouch Elves.

Moonshadow Elves
 Runaan (voiced by Jonathan Holmes): The leader of the Moonshadow Elf assassins sent to kill King Harrow, and Rayla's mentor and guardian.
 Lujanne (voiced by Ellie King): A Moonshadow Elf illusionist who lives in the human realms at the Moon Nexus, a focal area for primal moon magic.
 Ethari (voiced by Vincent Gale): Runaan's husband and one of Rayla's guardians.
 Tiadrin and Lain (voiced by Tyrone Savage and Ely Jackson): Rayla's parents who were part of the Dragonguard at the Storm Spire, and were sworn to protect the egg of the Dragon Prince.

Skywing Elves
 Naimi-Selari-Nykantia / Nyx (voiced by Rhona Rees): An avaricious Skywing Elf, one of the few of her kind gifted with functional wings who wishes to profit from any chance she gets.
 Ibis (voiced by Ian James Corlett): A Skywing Elf mage and the liaison between Queen Zubeia and other elves who was ultimately killed by Earthblood elf Terrestius two years later, but not before he warned Queen Zubeia of Aavros' imminent return.
 Hendyr (voiced by Iain Hendry): A winged Skywing Elf and former member of the Dragon Guard who fled his post at the Storm Spire.

Sunfire Elves
 Queen Janai (voiced by Rena Anakwe): A seasoned Sunfire Elf warrior, the younger sister of Queen Khessa and the older sister of Karim. Due to her past achievements, she is also known as the Golden Knight of Lux Aurea who guards the border between Xadia and the human kingdoms. At the end of the third season, she becomes the new queen of the Sunfire Elves.
 Queen Khessa (voiced by Brenda Crichlow): Janai and Karim's older sister and Queen of the Sunfire Elves from their capital of Lux Aurea.
 Kazi (voiced by Ashlecia Edmond): A Sunfire Elf linguist. 
 Sabah: A Sunfire Elf archer.
 Karim (voiced by Luc Roderique): Khessa and Janai's younger brother and the Sunfire court's magician. He is a fundamentalist who fears that the Sunfire Elves will forget their cultural heritage and pride if they get involved with other cultures, and therefore begins plotting against his sister.
 General Miyana (voiced by Cecilly Day): A member of the Six Horns, a council of Sunfire Elf generals, and Karim's lover. 
 Yonnis (voiced by Deven Mack): A Sunfire Elf who is mourning the loss of his mother.
 Aditi: A former Sunfire Elf queen who worked as a mediator between Elves and Dragons until Aaravos was responsible for her disappearance many centuries ago in order to incite conflict between the two races. She was the late Kessa, Janai and Karim's grandmother who had forbade the blood duel of blood and ash.

Earthblood Elves
 Terrestrius / Terry (voiced by Benjamin Callins): A goofy Earthblood Elf and Claudia's boyfriend.
 Warlon (voiced by Bill Newton): A brash, boisterous Earthblood Elf warrior and Drakerider, one of the guardians of the Drakewood.
 N'than (voiced by Dylan Schombing): A juvenile Earthblood Elf who longs to become a Drakerider and befriends Callum, Ezran, Rayla and Zym.

Startouch Elves
 Aaravos (voiced by Erik Todd Dellums): An ancient Startouch Elf, also known as "the Fallen Star", and the main antagonist of the series who was imprisoned by the archdragons and elves, having been informed of his treachery from the Orphan Queen, within a hidden prison for orchestrating a series of conflicts between Xadia and the five human realms. He is a master of all six sources of primal magic and the seventh primal source of dark magic he himself had bestowed upon humankind. He is using Viren, his daughter Claudia, and ultimately High Mage Callum (who holds his cube-shaped Key) to accomplish his own sinister goals.

Dragons
 King Avizandum / "Thunder" (voiced by Chris Metzen): The former archdragon of the Sky and King of the Dragons who was killed by the humans before the beginning of the series. Also known as Thunder to the humans, he was the mate of Zubeia and the father of Azymondias.
 Queen Zubeia (voiced by Nicole Oliver): The current archdragon of the Sky and the Queen of the Dragons. She is the late Avizandum's mate and Azymondias' mother who resides atop the Storm Spire. She informs the four protagonists about the rogue Startouch elf Aavros and how dangerous a threat the Fallen Star poses to the world of humans, dragons, and elves alike. 
 Sol Regem (voiced by Adrian Hough): The Archdragon of the Sun and former King of the Dragons who hates humans after he was blinded by the dark archmage Ziard many centuries ago. Since then, he has roamed the border between Xadia and the five human kingdoms, protecting the former from any humans who attempt to cross.
 Pyrrah: A young female red-scaled Sun Dragon.
 Rex Igneous (voiced by Ben Cotton): The archdragon of the Earth who slumbers beneath the mountain Umber Tor.
 Domina Profundis: The archdragon of the Ocean.
 Luna Tenebris: The former archdragon of the Moon and Queen of the Dragons who was killed by Aaravos three hundred years before the series to incite a conflict between the Dragons and the Elves.
 Scarmaker / "Squeaky": A young Earth Dragon from the Uncharted Forest whom Soren saves from a brash Earthblood elf.

Animals
 Bait (vocalized by Jack De Sena): Ezran's grumpy pet Glowtoad.
 Pip: King Harrow's pet songbird.
 Ava: Ellis' three-legged wolf companion.
 Phoe-Phoe: Lujanne's Moon Phoenix companion with a twisted paw.
 Berto (voiced by Paula Burrows): Villads' parrot first mate onboard the Revenge.
 Embertail: A Twin-Tailed Inferno-Tooth Tiger and Janai's mount.
 Stella: A Cuddlemonkey attuned to Star magic who was adopted by Rayla.
 Aegis: A Twin-Tailed Inferno-Tooth Tiger and Amaya's mount.

Other Magical Creatures
 The Being / "Sir Sparklepuff": An Elf homunculus created by Aaravos to lead a resurrected Viren, Claudia and Terrestius to Umber Tor.
 Chert and Terbium (voiced by Mark Hildreth and Jason Simpson): The two stone giant door guards to Rex Igneous' mountain lair at Umber Tor.

Episodes

Book 1: Moon (2018)

Book 2: Sky (2019)

Book 3: Sun (2019)

Book 4: Earth (2022)

Production

Development
The series was first announced on July 10, 2018. It was co-created by Aaron Ehasz and Justin Richmond. Ehasz was the head writer and co-executive producer of the animated series Avatar: The Last Airbender, and a longtime writer and story editor for Futurama, while Richmond co-directed the video game Uncharted 3: Drake's Deception. Giancarlo Volpe, a former director for Avatar, is an executive producer.

The Dragon Prince is produced by Wonderstorm, a multimedia production studio co-founded in 2017, by Ehasz, Richmond, and Justin Santistevan to work both on The Dragon Prince and a related video game, and animated by Canadian studio Bardel Entertainment. In November 2019, several female former employees of Riot Games and Wonderstorm accused Ehasz of asking his female employees to take care of his children without permission and not taking women's creative ideas seriously. Although one anonymous accuser speculated that this could affect the show's continuation, Netflix renewed the show and all 7 seasons of the saga will be produced.

Style
The Dragon Prince is created using three-dimensional computer animation. A reduced frame rate was applied to the first season to offset "floatiness"; the frame rate was adjusted for the second season in response to fan feedback. Backgrounds are done by a mix of 3D-modeling and hand-painting.

Writing
The ending of season 2 was changed from the original plan in order to stay true to what the characters would choose. According to Ehasz, one of the creative team's fundamental goals regarding The Dragon Prince is "to portray a fantasy world that feels more diverse and representative than fantasy worlds and stories we’ve seen in the past."

Release
The Dragon Prince is available on the streaming service Netflix, in all territories where the streaming service is available. The first season was released on September 14, 2018. Episodes were released simultaneously, as opposed to a serialized format, to encourage binge-watching, a format which has been successful for other Netflix original series.

A trailer was released in July 2018 at the San Diego Comic-Con. The first season premiered in September 2018. A second season, announced in October 2018, was released on February 15, 2019. The third season was released on November 22, 2019. At the virtual ComicCon@Home 2020 panel "Zoom into Xadia", the continuation of the show over four more seasons was announced. Season four was released on November 3, 2022.

LGBT themes and representation

Season 1
Before the release of the show's first season, during the San Diego Comic-Con in July 2018, it was revealed that the series would contain LGBT characters in it; however, no details or characters were provided to avoid spoilers. On the day of the first season's release, Wonderstorm issued a statement regarding the show's handling of diversity, where co-creators Aaron Ehasz and Justin Richmond described the importance of telling a story with diverse characters in it, which is something they are passionate about. To achieve their goal of creating a diverse world and characters, it was decided that they would accomplish this through a variety of methods, with some examples singled out being the inclusion of racial diversity, the portrayal of non-typical family structures, as well as people with disabilities. Alongside these forms of representation, the representation of LGBT characters was also singled out.

Regarding The Dragon Princes diverse representation, it was stated that with some characters their arcs would "play out in ways that clearly demonstrate their difference or representation right away", but that with other characters their status as minorities would be "part of their identity, but not yet a part of their plot or storyline". Following the release of season 1, it was theorized that an unnamed elf that appears in the end credits illustrations of two episodes—dubbed "Tinker" by fans—was Runaan's boyfriend.

Season 2
The second season of The Dragon Prince included the show's first instance of LGBT representation. The Queens of Duren—Annika and Neha—appear in flashbacks set prior to the show's beginning and are depicted as a couple, sharing a kiss on-screen; they appear in two out of nine episodes. Vice noted how the series' creators have "acknowledged their commitment to making sure [the show] doesn’t use the "bury your gays" trope.

Despite this statement, in a pre-release review of the season, Michal Schick of Hypable discussed how the show's representation of these characters would likely cause debate, given that they can be viewed as falling under the "Bury your gays" trope. While Renaldo Matadeen of Comic Book Resources also acknowledged how the depiction of the Queens of Duren can fall under the "bury your gays" trope—also acknowledging fan complaints regarding this—he still praised the show's depiction of an openly lesbian couple. Similarly, The Mary Sues Caroline Cao argued that while their depiction adheres to the "bury your gay" trope, there are still positives to be found within these characters. Heather Hogan of Autostraddle also expressed mixed feelings towards the characters, acknowledging the characters as having positive attributes, but lamenting them already being dead by the time the story begins.

Following the second season's release and the show's future in terms of LGBT representation, Ehasz stated that there are more characters—including main characters—that are "non-straight". Regarding any future LGBT relationships presented in the series, Ehasz stated that they often let the characters lead them to where they will go next, including any potential relationships that might occur. For this reason, he described revealing a character to be LGBTQ+ as "challenging", as they do not want to give the impression to the audience that these characters will go on to be in a same-sex relationship, but also acknowledged that LGBT characters and relationships are underrepresented in media. Both Ehasz and Richmond stated that under the right circumstances, and with enough time to tell the story, they would like to explore their queer characters more and have their "identities manifest in relationships and in the story"

Season 3
The third season introduces Ethari, who is Runaan's husband. This season also introduces Kazi, who is non-binary and uses they/them pronouns, but this is only revealed outside of the story through the show's Twitter account. According to lead writer Devon Giehl, the writers intended there to be romantic interest between Amaya and Janai that starts at the end of season 3, and confirmed that both characters are lesbian who like each other.

In a pre-release review of season 3, Inverses Jake Kleinman criticized the show's LGBTQ+ representation, arguing that despite its initial promise, The Dragon Prince has never truly delivered on said promise. He criticized how the first season lacked any on-screen representation, while in season 2 the Queens of Duren only appear in flashbacks and are killed off. While Kleinman viewed the representation of Ethari and Runaan as an improvement, given that both characters are still alive by the end of the season, he found fault with Ethari's minimal role in the story.

Reception
Review aggregator website Rotten Tomatoes reports that 100% of 11 critics gave the first season a positive review; the average rating is 8.2 out of 10. 100% of six critics gave the second season a positive review; the average rating is 8.57 out of 10. 100% of five critics gave the third season a positive review; the average rating is 9 out of 10.

In an advance review of the first episode, IGN's Aaron Prune praised the series for "comfortably exploring dark story elements while giving audiences an assortment of lovable characters to engage with" and described it as a "worthwhile animated series for audiences of all ages." Reviewing the first three episodes, Alex Barasch of Slate was also positive towards the series, saying that despite the "slightly shaky animation and some markedly shakier accents", fans of fantasy or Avatar: The Last Airbender will like it. Barasch especially praised the show's inclusivity—such as King Harrow and Ezran, who are both black—and Harrow's relationship with Viren, which he described as "most compelling aspects of the show". Also reviewing the first three episodes, Gavia Baker-Whitelaw of The Daily Dot similarly reacted positively to the show's racial inclusion, writing that it "combines goofy humor with a solid basis for longterm storytelling and character development, the character designs show a deep affection for the genre". However, she criticized Rayla's accent as "the worst part of the show", along with the scarcity of female characters. Emily Ashby of Common Sense Media described the series as a "captivating fantasy tale" with positive themes and broad appeal. She also argued it was a "beautifully rendered epic animated fantasy", noted that characters kiss, said that the series is "brimming with mysticism, action, and suspense", and said it has similarities to Avatar: The Last Airbender and its spinoff sequel Avatar: The Legend of Korra.

Awards and nominations

In other media

Video game
Concurrently with the series, Wonderstorm is developing a video game based on the series and expanding on its plot. The game will be a combat-based multiplayer game, but not an MMO. Players will be able to play as characters from the series. No information about supported platforms or release dates has been made available yet.

Printed media
A trade paperback book by Tracey West, titled Callum's Spellbook, was published by Scholastic on March 3, 2020.
A behind-the-scenes art book, titled The Art of The Dragon Prince, was published by Dark Horse Comics on August 18, 2020.
A novelization of the first season, written by Aaron and Melanie McGanney Ehasz, was published by Scholastic on June 2, 2020.
A novelization of the  second season, written by Aaron and Melanie McGanney Ehasz, was published by Scholastic on August 3, 2021. 
A novelization of the  third season, written by Aaron and Melanie McGanney Ehasz, will be published by Scholastic on October 31, 2023. 
A graphic novel following up on the finale of the third season, titled The Dragon Prince: Through the Moon, was released on October 6, 2020. Taking place before the premiere of the fourth season, it deals with a plot in which Rayla descends into the Spirit World to find out what happened to her mentor Runaan and her allegedly late parents Lain and Teradain. 
A graphic novel titled Bloodmoon Huntress was announced on March 12, 2021. Released on July 19, 2022, its plot follows a young Rayla years several years before the events of the television series.
A graphic novel titled Puzzle House was announced at the San Diego Comic Con 2021 Dragon Prince panel. The plot is set to follow young Soren and Claudia at Viren's former mentor Kpp'Ar' residence, the "Puzzle House".
A tabletop role-playing game, titled Tales of Xadia, began its playtesting stage in 2020, with pre-orders having been opened on February 9, 2021. The game was released on March 29, 2022.

Notes

References

External links
 
 
 

Anime-influenced Western animated television series
2010s American animated television series
2018 American television series debuts
2010s Canadian animated television series
2018 Canadian television series debuts
2020s American animated television series
2020s Canadian animated television series
American children's animated action television series
American children's animated adventure television series
American children's animated comedy television series
American children's animated drama television series
American children's animated fantasy television series
American computer-animated television series
Canadian children's animated action television series
Canadian children's animated adventure television series
Canadian children's animated comedy television series
Canadian children's animated drama television series
Canadian children's animated fantasy television series
Canadian computer-animated television series
Daytime Emmy Award for Outstanding Animated Program winners
High fantasy television series
2010s American LGBT-related animated television series
2020s American LGBT-related animated television series
Netflix children's programming
Animated television series by Netflix
English-language Netflix original programming
Animated television series about dragons
LGBT speculative fiction television series